Rennerod is a Verbandsgemeinde ("collective municipality") in the district , in Rhineland-Palatinate, Germany.

The  Rennerod consists of the following  ("local municipalities"):

Verbandsgemeinde in Rhineland-Palatinate